Following is a list of marine reptiles, reptiles which are adapted to life in marine or brackish environments.

Extant
The following marine reptiles are species which are currently extant or recently extinct.

Crocodiles
Crocodylus
Crocodylus acutus (American crocodile)
Crocodylus porosus (Saltwater crocodile)

Lizards

Iguanidae
Amblyrhynchus
Amblyrhynchus cristatus (Marine iguana)
Varanidae
Varanus
Varanus indicus (Mangrove monitor)

Snakes
Acrochordidae (Filesnakes)
Acrochordus
Acrochordus arafurae (Arafura filesnake)
Acrochordus granulatus (Little filesnake)
Acrochordus javanicus (Javan file snake)
Dipsadinae
Farancia
Farancia abacura (Mud snake)
Farancia erythrogrammus (Rainbow snake)
Helicops
Helicops angulatus (Brown-banded water snake)
Helicops infrataeniatus
Helicops scalaris
Hydrops
Hydrops triangularis
Leptodeira
Leptodeira rubricata (Costa Rican cat-eyed snake)
Pseudoeryx
Pseudoeryx relictualis
Tretanorhinus
Tretanorhinus nigroluteus
Tretanorhinus variabilis
Grayiinae
Grayia
Grayia smythii (Smith's African water snake)
Homalopsidae (Bockadams)
Bitia hydroides (Keel-bellied water snake)
Cantoria violacea (Cantor's water snake)
Cerberus (Dog-faced water snakes)
Cerberus australis
Cerberus dunsoni
Cerberus microlepis
Cerberus rynchops
Cerberus schneiderii
Djokoiskandarus annulata (Banded water snake)
Myrrophis 
Myrrophis bennettii (Bennett's mud snake)
Fordonia leucobalia (White-bellied mangrove snake)
Myron
Myron karnsi 
Myron resetari 
Myron richardsonii 
Hydrophiinae (Sea snakes)
Aipysurus
Aipysurus eydouxii (Spine-tailed sea snake)
Aipysurus laevis (Olive sea snake)
Astrotia stokesii (Stoke's sea snake)
Disteira
Disteira major (Olive-headed or greater sea snake)
Disteira nigrocincta
Disteira walli (Wall's sea snake)
Enhydrina schistosa (Beaked sea snake, hook-nosed sea snake, common sea snake, Valakadyn sea snake)
Enhydrina zweifeli   (Sepik or Zweifel’s beaked seasnake)
Hydrophis
Hydrophis belcheri (Faint-banded sea snake, Belcher's sea snake)
Hydrophis bituberculatus (Peters' sea snake)
Hydrophis brooki
Hydrophis caerulescens (Dwarf sea snake)
Hydrophis cantoris
Hydrophis cyanocinctus (Annulated sea snake, blue-banded sea snake)
Hydrophis fasciatus (Striped sea snake)
Hydrophis gracilis (Graceful small-headed sea snake, slender sea snake)
Hydrophis inornatus (Plain sea snake)
Hydrophis klossi (Kloss' sea snake)
Hydrophis lapemoides (Persian Gulf sea snake)
Hydrophis mamillaris (Bombay sea snake)
Hydrophis melanocephalus (Slender-necked sea snake)
Hydrophis obscurus (Russell's sea snake)
Hydrophis ornatus (Ornate reef sea snake)
Hydrophis semperi (Garman's sea snake)
Hydrophis spiralis (Yellow sea snake)
Hydrophis stricticollis (Collared sea snake)
Hydrophis viperinus
Kerilia jerdonii (Jerdon's sea snake)
Kolpophis annandalei (Bighead sea snake)
Lapemis
Lapemis curtus (Shaw's sea snake)
Lapemis hardwickii (Hardwicke's spine-bellied sea snake)
Laticauda
Laticauda colubrina (Colubrine sea krait, yellow-lipped sea krait)
Laticauda laticaudata (Blue-lipped sea krait)
Pelamis platurus (Yellowbelly sea snake, pelagic sea snake)
Thalassophis
Thalassophis anomalus (Anomalous sea snake)

Sea turtles
Dermochelyidae
Dermochelys coriacea (leatherback sea turtle)

Cheloniidae
Caretta caretta (Loggerhead sea turtle)
Lepidochelys kempii (Kemp's ridley)
Lepidochelys olivacea (Olive ridley)
Chelonia mydas (Green sea turtle)
Eretmochelys imbricata (Hawksbill sea turtle)
Natator depressus (Flatback sea turtle)

Extinct
From the Permian to the present day there have been numerous groups of extinct reptiles that adapted to life in the marine realm:

Mesosaurs
Mesosauridae: Early Permian
Stereosternum
Mesosaurus

Phytosaurs
Pseudopalatinae: Late Triassic
Mystriosuchus

Squamates
Dolichosauridae: Late Cretaceous
Adriosaurus
Dolichosaurus
Judeasaurus
Mosasauroidea 
Aigialosauridae
Opetiosaurus
Aigialosaurus
Portunatasaurus
Mosasauridae 
Kaganaias
Mosasaurinae
Carinodens
Clidastes
Dallasaurus
Globidens
Mosasaurus
Plotosaurus
Prognathodon
Halisaurinae
Eonatator
Halisaurus
Tylosaurinae
Hainosaurus
Tylosaurus
Taniwhasaurus
Plioplatecarpinae
Platecarpus
Plioplatecarpus
Selmasaurus
Ophidia
Simoliophiidae: Late Cretaceous
Eupodophis
Haasiophis
Pachyophis
Pachyrhachis
Palaeophiidae: Late Cretaceous - Eocene
Archaeophis
Palaeophis
Pterosphenus

Protorosaurs
Dinocephalosaurus: Middle Triassic
Tanystropheus: Middle Triassic

Sauropterygians
Placodonts: Triassic
Cyamodus
Henodus
Paraplacodus
Placochelys
Placodus
Psephoderma

Nothosaurs: Triassic
Lariosaurus
Nothosaurus

Pachypleurosaurs: Triassic
Anarosaurus
Dactylosaurus
Keichousaurus
Neusticosaurus (Pachypleurosaurus)

Pistosaurus:Middle Triassic
Plesiosaurs: Early Jurassic - Late Cretaceous
Plesiosauroids: Early Jurassic - Late Cretaceous
Plesiosaurus
Cimoliasauridae
Cryptoclididae
Cryptoclidus
Microcleidus
Muraenosaurus
Elasmosauridae
Elasmosaurus
Futabasaurus
Hydrotherosaurus
Libonectes
Mauisaurus
Thalassomedon
Polycotylidae
Dolichorhynchops
Edgarosaurus
Manemergus
Sulcusuchus
Thililua
Trinacromerum

Pliosaurs: Early Jurassic - Late Cretaceous
Kronosaurus
Liopleurodon
Macroplata
Peloneustes
Rhomaleosaurus
Umoonasaurus
Sachicasaurus

Ichthyosaurs
Ichthyosaurus
Shastasaurus
Shonisaurus

Choristoderes
Champsosaurus
Simoedosaurus
?Pachystropheus (sometimes considered a thalattosaur)
?Actiosaurus

Crocodylomorphs
Thalattosuchia: Early Jurassic - Early Cretaceous
Metriorhynchoidea
Eoneustes
Teleidosaurus
Zoneait
Aggiosaurus
Dakosaurus
Enaliosuchus
Geosaurus
Metriorhynchus
Neustosaurus
Purranisaurus
Teleidosaurus
Teleosauridae
Machimosaurus
Pelagosaurus
Platysuchus
Teleosaurus
Steneosaurus

Tethysuchia: Middle Jurassic - Early Eocene
Pholidosauridae: Middle Jurassic - Late Cretaceous
Elosuchus
Oceanosuchus
Terminonaris

Dyrosauridae: Late Cretaceous - Early Eocene
Arambourgisuchus
Atlantosuchus
Dyrosaurus
Guarinisuchus
Phosphatosaurus
Rhabdognathus

Gavialoidea: Late Cretaceous - Recent
Eothoracosaurus
Thoracosaurus
Eosuchus
Argochampsa
Eogavialis
Ikanogavialis
Piscogavialis
Siquisiquesuchus
Gryposuchus
Aktiogavialis

Testudines
Chelonioidea
Allopleuron
Archelon
Pneumatoarthrus
Protostega
Araripemydidae
Araripemys
Bothremydidae

Thalattosaurs

Agkistrognathus campebelli
Anshunsaurus huangguoshuensis
Anshunsaurus wushaensis
Askeptosaurus italicus
Concavispina biseridens
Clarazia schinzi
Endennasaurus acutirostris
Hescheleria ruebeli
Miodentosaurus brevis
Nectosaurus halius
Paralonectes merriami
Thalattosaurus alexandrae
Thalattosaurus borealis
Xinpusaurus suni

See also

References

Marine
List of